Eduardo Santana (born November 28, 1958) is a former Brazilian football player and manager.

He last coached of C.D. Dragón in the Segunda División de Fútbol Salvadoreño of El Salvador.

External links
Eduardo Santana, técnico del Balboa - El Gráfico 
 Eduardo Santana at playmakerstats.com (English version of ceroacero.es)
mybestplay.com

1958 births
Living people
Brazilian footballers
C.D. Águila footballers
Xelajú MC players
Aurora F.C. players
C.D. Olimpia players
C.S.D. Municipal players
C.D. Suchitepéquez players
L.D. Alajuelense footballers
Expatriate footballers in El Salvador
Expatriate footballers in Guatemala
Expatriate footballers in Honduras
Expatriate footballers in Costa Rica
Brazilian football managers
Expatriate football managers in El Salvador
Liga FPD players
Association footballers not categorized by position
Deportivo Petapa managers
Brazilian expatriate sportspeople in Belize
Brazilian expatriate sportspeople in Costa Rica
Brazilian expatriate sportspeople in El Salvador
Brazilian expatriate sportspeople in Guatemala
Brazilian expatriate sportspeople in Honduras